Kelly Jane Tolhurst (born 23 August 1978) is a British politician who has served as the Member of Parliament (MP) for Rochester and Strood since 2015. A member of the Conservative Party, she served as Minister of State for Schools and Childhood from September to October 2022.

Tolhurst previously served as Parliamentary Under-Secretary of State for Rough Sleeping and Housing from 2020 to 2021, Parliamentary Under-Secretary of State for Aviation and Maritime in 2020 and Parliamentary Under-Secretary of State for Small Business, Consumers and Corporate Responsibility from 2018 to 2020 and was briefly Deputy Chief Whip in 2022. She is a former councillor for the Rochester West ward on Medway Council.

Early life
Tolhurst was born in Rochester; her father was a local boat builder, Morris Tolhurst. She was educated locally at Chapter High School. From 2008, she ran a marine survey business, called Tolhurst Associates, with her father, with employment in marketing previous to this point.

Political career
Tolhurst was elected to the Rochester West ward on Medway Council in 2011 and served as a councillor until 2018 when she resigned. In the by-election for the ward that followed in March 2018, the seat was taken by the Labour candidate Alex Paterson. She was selected to contest the 2014 Rochester and Strood by-election which was triggered by the defection of Mark Reckless to UKIP. Tolhurst lost the by-election, held on 20 November 2014, but regained the seat for the Conservatives at the 2015 general election six months later, securing a majority of over 7,000. She was re-elected in 2017.

Tolhurst has served on the Business, Energy and Industrial Strategy Committee, the European Scrutiny Committee and the Business, Innovation and Skills Committee. She was made an assistant government whip during the reshuffle on 9 January 2018.

Tolhurst was appointed the Parliamentary Under-Secretary of State for Small Business, Consumers and Labour Markets at the Department for Business, Energy and Industrial Strategy on 19 July 2018.

In February 2020, Tolhurst was appointed as the Parliamentary Under-Secretary of State for Transport at the Department for Transport, succeeding Nus Ghani who had been relieved of ministerial responsibilities. Tolhurst garnered criticism in March 2020 after commenting in the House of Commons that the government were not responsible for "propping up" airlines as a result of the collapse of Flybe.

Tolhurst campaigned to remain in the European Union prior to the 2016 referendum.

Tolhurst was appointed as the Parliamentary Under-Secretary of State for Local Government and Homelessness at the Ministry of Housing, Communities and Local Government in September 2020, replacing Luke Hall, who had in turn replaced Simon Clarke in a different position in the same department. She resigned from this position in January 2021 after receiving "devastating family news".

On 1 July 2022, Tolhurst was appointed Government Deputy Chief Whip and Treasurer of the Household by Prime Minister Boris Johnson, following the resignation of Chris Pincher.

On 7 September 2022, she was appointed Minister of State in the Department for Education.

On 22 February 2023, she was appointed as a member of the Privy Council.

References

External links 

1978 births
Conservative Party (UK) councillors
Conservative Party (UK) MPs for English constituencies
Councillors in Kent
Female members of the Parliament of the United Kingdom for English constituencies
Living people
People from Rochester, Kent
Politics of Medway
UK MPs 2015–2017
UK MPs 2017–2019
UK MPs 2019–present
21st-century British women politicians
21st-century English women
21st-century English people
Women councillors in England
Members of the Privy Council of the United Kingdom